Uthai Thani may refer to
the town Uthai Thani
Uthai Thani Province
Mueang Uthai Thani district